Steinshardt is a locality in the municipality Sankt Katharinen in the district of Neuwied in Rhineland-Palatinate, Germany.

Villages in Rhineland-Palatinate